Christopher Columbus Museum is a museum in Valladolid in western Spain built in 1968. Outside is a statue of the Santa María.

Gallery

References

History museums in Spain
Museums in Valladolid
Biographical museums in Spain